The 2011–12 Algerian Women's Championship was the 14th season of the Algerian Women's Championship, the Algerian national women's association football competition. Afak Relizane won the championship for the third consecutive time.

2011-12 teams

Results

References

External links
Algeria (Women) 2011/12 - [Rec.Sport.Soccer Statistics Foundation|RSSSF]

Algerian Women's Championship seasons